George Roger Sell (February 7, 1937 – May 29, 2015) was an American mathematician, specializing in differential equations, dynamical systems, and applications to fluid dynamics, climate modeling, control systems, and other subjects.

Biography
Sell was born in Milwaukee, Wisconsin. He received in 1957 his bachelor's degree and in 1958 his M.Sc. from Marquette University and in 1962 his Ph.D. from the University of Michigan with thesis under the direction of Wilfred Kaplan and Lamberto Cesari. The mathematics department there awarded him the Sumner B. Myers Prize for the year's best doctoral dissertation submitted to the department. As a graduate student, Sell held a recurring summer job at the AC Spark Plug Division of AC Delco, working on the guidance system for Titan rockets. He was a Benjamin Peirce instructor from 1962 to 1964 at Harvard University. He was from 1964 to 1968 an assistant professor, from 1968 to 1973 an associate, and from 1973 until retirement a full professor at the University of Minnesota. From 1982 to 1987 Sell was the associate director of the Institute for Mathematics and its Applications. From 1984 to 1994 he was the director of the Army High Performance Computing Research Center at the University of Minnesota campus. He was a visiting professor on sabbatical at various institutions, including the University of Southern California and the University of Florence, where he worked with Roberto Conti. Sell was the author or coauthor of more than 120 publication in refereed journals.

In 1983 he was an Invited Speaker at the ICM in Warsaw. In 1988 he was the founding editor-in-chief of the Journal of Dynamics and Differential Equations. In 1990 Leningrad State University awarded him an honorary doctorate, who was the fifth foreigner given that particular distinction. In July 2002 Spain's University of Valladolid sponsored a conference in his honor at Medina del Campo. In 2012 he was elected a Fellow of the American Mathematical Society.

Upon his death he was survived by his wife, six children, and several grandchildren.

Selected publications

Articles
"A note on the fundamental theory of ordinary differential equations," Bull. Amer. Math. Soc. 70 (1964): 529–535 
"Almost periodic and periodic solutions of difference equations," Bull. Amer. Math. Soc. 72 (1966): 261–265 
"Nonautonomous differential equations as dynamical systems: I and II," Trans. Amer. Math. Soc. 127 (1967); I. The basic theory, 214–262 ; II. Limiting equations, 263–283 
with Wayne W. Schmaedeke: "The Gronwall inequality for modified Stieltjes integrals," Proc. Amer. Math. Soc. 19 (1968): 1217–1222 
with L. Markus: "Control in conservative dynamical systems. Recurrence and capture in aperiodic fields," J. Differential Equations 16 (1974): 472–505. 
with R. J. Sacker: "Finite extensions of minimal transformation groups," Trans. Amer. Math. Soc. 190 (1974): 429–458 
with R. J. Sacker: "A note on Anosov diffeomorphisms," Bull. Amer. Math. Soc. 80 (1974): 278–280 
"A remark on an example of R. A. Johnson," Proc. Amer. Math. Soc. 82 (1981): 206–208 
with K. R. Meyer: "Melnikov transformations, Bernoulli bundles and almost periodic perturbations," Trans. Amer. Math. Soc. 314 (1989): 63–105. 
with J. Mallet-Paret: "Inertial manifolds for reaction-diffusion equations in higher space dimensions," J. Amer. Math. Soc. 1 (1988): 805–866. 
with G. Raugel: "Navier-Stokes equations on thin 3D domains I: Global attractors and global regularity of solutions," J. Amer. Math. Soc. 6 (1993): 503–568.

Books
with Richard K. Miller: 

with R. J. Sacker: 
with A. W. Naylor:  
with Ciprian Foiaș and Roger Temam: 
with Yuncheng You:

References

1937 births
2015 deaths
Writers from Milwaukee
Marquette University alumni
University of Michigan alumni
University of Minnesota faculty
20th-century American mathematicians
21st-century American mathematicians
Dynamical systems theorists
Fellows of the American Mathematical Society